Jordan Smith (born December 25, 1984, in Angeles City, Philippines) is an American mixed martial arts fighter who last competed in 2014.

Background
Smith's nickname "Mata Ele" is Portuguese for "Kill him." While attending McKendree University, Smith attended an amateur MMA event with his brother, Jake. A former football player, Smith soon began training in MMA himself.

Mixed martial arts career

Early career
Smith made his amateur debut on June 15, 2007, at 205 lbs with a 19 second TKO victory over Alex May. He amassed a record of 5 amateur fights, all ending with first round finishes.

Smith made his professional debut on December 8, 2007, in the light heavyweight division. He won his first 10 professional fights, finishing all 10 opponents, 8 in the first round. Following a draw with the much larger Rich Hale, Smith dropped to the 185 lb weight class for his next fight, a first round submission of IFL veteran Bristol Marunde.

Jordan then appeared on the first episode of The Ultimate Fighter: Team Liddell vs. Team Ortiz, where he lost via KO to Brad Tavares. He followed his TUF loss with 3 victories at 185 lbs. He lost via split decision to UFC veteran Josh Burkman at a catchweight of 180 lbs.

Following the Burkman fight Jordan once again dropped weight classes settling at Welterweight (170). His Welterweight debut resulted in a third round submission of Mario Sartori. Jordan's next fight ended in only 11 seconds, with him getting TKO'd by Tim McKenzie. Jordan has since earned decision victories over well known UFC veteran Karo Parisyan and WEC and Strikeforce veteran Josh McDonald.

Bellator Fighting Championships
In 2012, Smith was featured in the Bellator Season Six Welterweight Tournament. He replaced Brian Foster in the opening round of the welterweight tournament and faced David Rickels in the opening round of the tournament at Bellator 63 and lost via first round KO.

Jordan faced Andrey Koreshkov on September 28, 2012, at Bellator LXXIV. He lost the fight via unanimous decision.

Personal life
Smith is a middle school science teacher at West Point Junior High School in Utah.

Mixed martial arts record

|-
|Loss
|align=center|18–7–1
|Anatoly Tokov
|Decision (unanimous)
|Plotforma S-70 5
|
|align=center| 3
|align=center| 5:00
|Sochi, Russia
|
|-
|Loss
|align=center|18–6–1
|Edgar García
|Decision (split)
|Showdown Fights 13: Lopez vs. Castillo
|
|align=center|3
|align=center|5:00
|Orem, Utah, United States
|
|-
|Win
|align=center|18–5–1
|Colton Vaughan
|TKO (punches)
|RITC: Rage in the Cage 7
|
|align=center|1
|align=center|3:34
|Nampa, Idaho, United States
|Return to Middleweight.
|-
|Loss
|align=center|17–5–1
|Jesse Juarez
|Decision (split)
|Bellator 90
|
|align=center|3
|align=center|5:00
|West Valley City, Utah, United States
|
|-
|Loss
|align=center|17–4–1
|Andrey Koreshkov
|Decision (unanimous)
|Bellator 74
|
|align=center|3
|align=center|5:00
|Atlantic City, New Jersey, United States
|Bellator Season Seven Welterweight Tournament Quarterfinal.
|-
|Loss
|align=center|17–3–1
|David Rickels
|KO (punches)
|Bellator 63
|
|align=center| 1
|align=center| 0:22
|Uncasville, Connecticut, United States
|Bellator Season Six Welterweight Tournament Quarterfinal.
|-
|Win
|align=center|17–2–1
|Josh McDonald
|Decision (unanimous)
|Showdown Fights: Evolution
|
|align=center| 3
|align=center| 5:00
|Orem, Utah, United States
|
|-
|Win
|align=center|16–2–1
|Karo Parisyan
|Decision (split)
|Amazon Forest Combat 1
|
|align=center| 3
|align=center| 5:00
|Manaus, Brazil
|
|-
|Loss
|align=center|15–2–1
|Tim McKenzie
|TKO (punches)
|Showdown Fights: Shootout
|
|align=center| 1
|align=center| 0:11
|Orem, Utah, United States
|
|-
|Win
|align=center|15–1–1
|Mario Sartori
|Submission (rear-naked choke)
|Bitetti Combat 8: 100 Years of Corinthians
|
|align=center| 3
|align=center| 4:52
|São Paulo, Brazil
|
|-
|Loss
|align=center|14–1–1
|Joshua Burkman
|Decision (split)
|Showdown Fights: Respect
|
|align=center| 3
|align=center| 5:00
|Orem, Utah, United States
|
|-
|Win
|align=center|14–0–1
|Brandon Melendez
|Submission (guillotine choke)
|World Championship Full Contact
|
|align=center| 1
|align=center| 3:23
|Salt Lake City, Utah, United States
|Welterweight debut.
|-
|Win
|align=center|13–0–1
|Gustavo Machado
|Decision (unanimous)
|Washington Combat: Battle of the Legends
|
|align=center| 3
|align=center| 5:00
|Washington, D.C., United States
|
|-
|Win
|align=center|12–0–1
|Nick Rossborough
|KO (punches)
|World Championship Full Contact
|
|align=center| 1
|align=center| 2:32
|Salt Lake City, Utah, United States
|Light Heavyweight bout.
|-
|Win
|align=center|11–0–1
|Bristol Marunde
|Submission (triangle choke)
|Throwdown Showdown 5: Homecoming
|
|align=center| 1
|align=center| 2:52
|Orem, Utah, United States
|Middleweight debut.
|-
|Draw
|align=center|10–0–1
|Rich Hale
|Draw
|Throwdown Showdown 4: Cuatro
|
|align=center| 5
|align=center| 5:00
|West Valley City, Utah, United States
|
|-
|Win
|align=center|10–0
|Sean O'Connell
|Submission (rear-naked choke)
|Throwdown Showdown 3: Big Time
|
|align=center|1
|align=center|2:30
|Salt Lake City, Utah, United States
|
|-
|Win
|align=center|9–0
|Jeremy Peterson
|TKO
|Jeremy Horn's Elite Fight Night 5
|
|align=center|2
|align=center|N/A
|Layton, Utah, United States
|
|-
|Win
|align=center|8–0
|Ben Fuimaono
|Submission (rear-naked choke)
|Throwdown Showdown 2: The Return
|
|align=center|1
|align=center|1:34
|Orem, Utah, United States
|
|-
|Win
|align=center|7–0
|Rich Guerin
|Technical Submission (rear-naked choke)
|LMMA: Lightning at Legends
|
|align=center|1
|align=center|N/A
|Toppenish, Washington, United States]
|
|-
|Win
|align=center|6–0
|Booker DeRousse
|Submission (rear-naked choke)
|Take That Promotions: Battle at The Bend 1
|
|align=center|1
|align=center|2:59
|Bethalto, Illinois, United States
|
|-
|Win
|align=center|5–0
|Tua Lino
|TKO (punches)
|Jeremy Horn's Elite Fight Night 2
|
|align=center|1
|align=center|2:30
|Salt Lake City, Utah, United States
|
|-
|Win
|align=center|4–0
|Dave Bosen
|TKO
|UCE: Round 30, Episode 7
|
|align=center|2
|align=center|1:42
|Salt Lake City, Utah, United States
|
|-
|Win
|align=center|3–0
|Bill Woodson
|Submission (guillotine choke)
|UCE: Round 30, Episode 4
|
|align=center|1
|align=center|1:59
|Salt Lake City, Utah, United States
|
|-
|Win
|align=center|2–0
|Aaron Sawyer
|TKO (injury)
|UCE: Round 29, Episode 1
|
|align=center|1
|align=center|5:00
|Salt Lake City, Utah, United States
|
|-
|Win
|align=center|1–0
|Alex May
|TKO (punches)
|MMA: Genesis 3
|
|align=center|1
|align=center|0:19
|St. Charles, Missouri, United States
|

References

External links
 

Living people
American male mixed martial artists
1984 births